The Pennsylvania Governor's School for the Sciences (PGSS) is now the only remaining part of the Pennsylvania Governor's Schools of Excellence, a group of five-week summer programs for gifted and highly intelligent high-school students in the state of Pennsylvania. Carnegie Mellon University in Pittsburgh has hosted the program since its inception in 1982.  Most recently, it has been directed by Physics Professor Dr. Barry Luokkala. Participants are required to be Pennsylvania high school students between their junior and senior years and are required to live in the dormitories for the full five weeks of the program. Admission is very competitive - approximately 500 of the most scientifically gifted students in the state compete for 56 to 60 slots in the program. The aim of PGSS is to promote interest in science rather than to advance students' knowledge in a specific area. The curriculum includes five "core" courses in Biology, Chemistry, Computer Science, Mathematics and Physics, and numerous electives. In addition to taking classes, students are required to participate in a lab course and a research-style team project. The emphasis is on cooperation, rather than competition - students are encouraged to both collaborate with other students on academic work and to interact socially.  The Residence Life staff provides a number of structured social events to foster friendship and teamwork. There is at least one event per day and is advertised on the social calendar in the dorm lobby.  For many students, the social development gained from the program rivals the scientific knowledge they acquire.  The students leave the program with a strong bond; most attend an organized reunion the following year after the 4th week of the program.

PGSS was discontinued in 2009 by Governor Ed Rendell who cut all funding for PGSEs from the 2009-2010 budget. 

After the program closed, a group of PGSS alumni and parent volunteers worked on what was called the most important "team project": the restoration of PGSS. This included the following milestones: organizing PGSS Campaign, Inc. as a registered 501(c)3 nonprofit organization, locating over 95% of the 2400 alumni, and many of their parents, collecting over $900,000 in donations from these individuals, meeting with former Governor Thomas Corbett and several former Secretaries of Education, meeting with key legislative leaders in Pennsylvania, hiring a part-time Executive Director, gaining formal recognition as an Education Improvement Organization (EITC), and securing numerous corporate grants. Since then, PGSS alumni have donated over $1,500,000 to the program with nothing personal to gain since they have already been through the program; they believe in the importance of PGSS for future students.

After several years of work by PGSS Campaign, the Commonwealth of Pennsylvania awarded Carnegie Mellon University a matching $150,000 grant to operate PGSS in 2013 and 2014. This provided half of the required funds for a 54-student program. To secure the funding from the state, the non-profit PGSS Campaign, Inc. had to agree to match those funds, and raised that and more to allow 60 students to attend each summer. PGSS was ultimately restored in 2013, and PGSS 2014 followed the next summer. Although Governor Corbett put a line item in the 2014 budget, the legislature took it out in the final version. TeamPA provided the matching $150,000 grant to Carnegie Mellon for PGSS 2015, and PGSS Campaign continued to raise funds for the match. PGSS Campaign hosted PGSS 2016 through 2019 with only in-kind support from the Commonwealth due to the generosity of PGSS alumni, family and friends as well as corporate support secured by PGSS Campaign. PGSS Campaign is still in discussion with the state about funding and has had some funding from the state in 2021 and 2022. PGSS Campaign hopes to increase the number of students even more, closer to the earlier 90-student program. PGSS 2022 had 72 students in attendance.

PGSS Campaign, Inc. also functions as a PGSS alumni association. PGSS Campaign, Inc. has arranged successful reunions in Pittsburgh, Philadelphia, Boston, San Francisco, DC, Austin, Houston, Seattle, New York and more. Since COVID, there have been several virtual reunions, and in the summer of 2022, PGSS Campaign hosted a 40th anniversary of the founding of PGSS celebration. PGSS Campaign also started a mentoring program connecting recent alumni with alumni from previous years which has operated successfully since 2013.

Applications are available for interested high-school juniors who reside in PA at

Core Courses
None of the teachers of the core courses are required to teach any one particular area or course. They are simply hired to teach a course in the general subject area. As a result, the core courses vary from year to year. However, it is typical for the Biology course to be in HIV/AIDS Biotechnology, the Chemistry course to be in Organic Chemistry, the Mathematics Course on Discrete Mathematics and the Physics course typically covers concepts in Modern Physics, often focusing on Special Relativity. The  Computer Science Course covers basic programming concepts and offers independent study for those with experience. As it is not unusual for a student in the PGSS program to be unfamiliar with a topic, it is common for the students to help one another to stay abreast of the workload. The core courses typically run fifty minutes each four days a week, with four courses each day from Monday through Friday. Students may drop one core course after two weeks, provided that they are taking at least one elective and have completed outstanding homework assignments in that course. The core professors often return for multiple summers.  Dr. Mark Farrell of Point Park University usually teaches the chemistry course and is the only faculty to have been with the program since the beginning of the program.  Dr. Richard Holman of Carnegie Mellon has been teaching the physics core since the early 1990s.  Dr. Ben Campbell was a student in the program in 1997 and has been a TA or faculty member every year but one since.

Lab Courses
A laboratory course is offered in every subject. Typically, one or more inter-disciplinary laboratory courses are added, such as Forensic Science. These usually meet twice a week for three hours. Depending on the subject area, it may be required that the laboratory course and the Team Project be in the same area.

Electives
This is perhaps the second most variant course topic in the PGSS program, with the most variant being the team projects. Electives typically run for an hour twice a week. Taking more than four electives in addition to all of the core courses is not permitted without special permission from the director. Usually, several electives, including Astrophysics, Laser Technology, the Science of Music, Material Science and several Mathematics electives are consistently offered every year, although content in these courses may change. Past Math Electives were taught by longtime PGSS faculty, Juan Schaffer, who was often revered by students for his mathematical genius and resemblance to Einstein until his passing in 2017.

Team Projects

All PGSS students are required to participate in a team project. The areas generally match the areas of the core courses. These team projects, each culminating in a final scientific research paper, are presented during the last week of the PGSS program known as "Team Project Week." During Team Project Week, no classes are held, due to the immense demand on the participants' time from their research paper and presentations. The final papers are compiled for the PGSS Journal.

Homework
Typically, PGSS students must complete and hand in an assignment once a week for every core course and must also hand in any homework for electives. This usually works out such that one core course assignment is due every weekday. The PGSS program strives to emulate the modern scientific community by encouraging collaboration and cooperation among students as they complete their assignments. The homework problems are often designed to require copious amounts of time and effort if one attempts to solve them without teaming up, thus encouraging a cooperative atmosphere. In addition to this, students participating in this program are not ranked among their peers, thus removing any reason for isolation solely to stand out. There are no grades given.

Location
From the inception of the program until 2000 the PGSS program used the Hamerschlag House (also referred to as the 'Schlag) as the coed residence for the students with the boys housed in one wing, and the girls in the other. In 2001 the program was moved to Morewood E tower floors 4-7 (each sex having 2 floors) with the lounge in Morewood Underground. The program briefly moved back to Hamerschlag before going to Mudge House starting in 2007, with girls living in the main house and boys housed in one wing. The 2013 and 2014 programs were housed in Donner House, with boys in the southern wing and girls in the northern wing. In 2017 and onwards, the program's housing has been moved to Scobell House where the boys lived on the bottom two floors and the girls on the two upper floors.
As of 2022, the housing has been moved back to Hamerschlag House.

References

External links
PGSS Official Homepage
PGSS Journal Archives
PGSS Alumni Association

Carnegie Mellon University
Education in Pennsylvania
Gifted education
Governor's Schools
1982 establishments in Pennsylvania